Monopoly Millionaires' Club is an American game show that debuted in syndication on March 28, 2015. Hosted by stand-up comedian/actor Billy Gardell, best known for his role as Chicago police officer Mike Biggs on the sitcom Mike & Molly, it was initially based on an unsuccessful drawing game of the same name that was coordinated by the Multi-State Lottery Association (MUSL), using the Monopoly board game brand under license from Hasbro. The lottery game returned, in scratch-off form, in the spring of 2015.

Each episode culminated with a round called "Go for a Million," a bonus game with a top prize of $1,000,000. The show originated as an hour-long program in its first season, which aired from March 28 to June 13, 2015, consisting of five games per episode. For the second season, which aired from September 12, 2015, to April 30, 2016, the show was reduced to a 30-minute format incorporating only three games. The program's cancellation was announced February 9, 2016.

Format
Each episode featured winners of a second chance drawing (through an online website), who were flown to Las Vegas to participate in the show. Selected contestants, each from a different section of the audience, played a series of games that each offered a top prize of $100,000. Every contestant played a different game and kept half of his/her winnings, with the other half split equally among the drawing winners in his/her section.

Episodes were originally taped at the Rio All Suite Hotel and Casino and featured five games per hour-long episode. The audience was split into five sections (battleship, boot, cat, dog, and wheelbarrow—all named after tokens in the classic U.S. version of Monopoly). One contestant was chosen from each section to play a game. Later, the taping location was moved to Bally's Events Center in Bally's Las Vegas and the episodes were reduced to 30 minutes featuring three games. The boot and cat sections were initially removed, but later restored. Contestants were still chosen from different sections.

Residents of states that did not sell lottery tickets during the period of the show's production were not eligible to participate in the program.

$100,000 Games
Advance to Boardwalk: One of the show's models stood at one end of a 13-space path, with Boardwalk at the other end. The spaces were marked in increments of $1,000, starting with $1,000 on the space nearest the model's end and increasing to $13,000. The contestant rolled an oversized die to determine how far the model moved, with her first step taking her to the $1,000 space. The amount she landed on was added to the bank, and the number rolled was taken out of play. The contestant was given a "Roll Again" token, which could be used to continue the game if an out-of-play number was rolled, but the model did not move on that turn. From this point forward, the contestant could end the game after any turn and keep the money. If a second out-of-play number came up, the game ended and the contestant forfeited the money. Landing on Boardwalk awarded $100,000; any rolls higher than the number of steps needed to reach Boardwalk were wasted. The game continued as long as there were numbers that would allow the model to move toward or onto Boardwalk without overshooting. If it became impossible to make a legal move, the game ended immediately and the contestant took the banked money.
 Bank Buster: The contestant faced a bank vault door secured with six locks, each worth a different amount ($6,000, $7,000, $8,000, $9,000, $10,000 or $20,000). One key had to be selected at a time from a set of 12—two for each lock—and a model inserted it into the vault's key slot to reveal the lock to which it corresponded. Finding the first key for a lock opened it and added its value to the bank. However, if the contestant found the second key, that lock closed again and the value was deducted. The contestant could stop after any turn and keep the banked money. Opening five locks at once awarded $100,000, but closing two ended the game and forfeited the money.
Block Party: The contestant was shown a rack of 12 cards, consisting of eight representing the color groups on a regulation Monopoly board, one "Block Party" card, and three strikes. One card had to be selected at a time to be revealed. Finding a color group lit it up on the board and added money to the bank, starting at $1,000 for the brown group and increasing clockwise to $20,000 for dark blue. Finding the "Block Party" card allowed the contestant to claim a single side of the board and collect the money for any unlit groups there; the cards for those groups were then taken out of play. Finding the first strike incurred no penalty, but from this point on, the contestant could stop after any turn and keep the money. The second strike cut the money in the bank in half, while the third ended the game and forfeited the money. Claiming all eight groups awarded the contestant with $100,000, regardless of the number of previously revealed strikes.
 Community Chest: This game used 10 chests, each containing a different amount of money, and was played under two different sets of rules during the show's run.
 March – October 2015: The amounts of the chests ranged from $500 to $5,000 in $500 increments. The contestant picked a chest, whose amount was revealed, and the values of all remaining chests were doubled. At any point after picking a chest, the contestant could either keep the money and end the game early, or return it for another pick. If the next pick revealed a smaller amount than the returned value, the game ended and no money was awarded. Ties were broken in the contestant's favor. The values doubled after every pick, to a maximum of $100,000. If it became impossible for the contestant to find a higher value on the next pick, the game ended and he/she received the last value chosen.
 October 2015 – April 2016: Seven chests contained amounts from $0 to $3,000 in $500 increments, while the last three held $4,000, $5,000, and $6,000. The contestant picked three chests, one at a time; after each pick, the value inside was revealed and added to the bank, and the values of all remaining chests were doubled. After the third pick, the contestant could either stop and take the banked money or select a fourth chest, which was then added to the bank. If the total money banked was at least $50,000 after the fourth chest was opened, the contestant won $100,000; otherwise no money was awarded.
Electric Company: The contestant was shown a board of 25 light bulbs and a display of 10 switches, each of which lit up a different number of bulbs, ranging from one to ten. The contestant flipped one switch at a time, and the bulbs lit up starting on the bottom row, proceeding from left to right. Each lit bulb added money to the bank, with later bulbs worth higher amounts, but the top right bulb was red, which would cause a "blackout" if lit. Once there was at least one remaining switch that could light the red bulb, the contestant could stop after any turn and keep the money. Lighting all 24 white bulbs awarded $100,000, but if the red bulb was ever lit, the game ended and all money was lost. If no more switches could be flipped without lighting the red bulb, the game ended immediately and the contestant took the banked money.
No Vacancy: The contestant was shown a three-story hotel with seven rooms per floor. There were also five limousines at a time, each carrying a different number of passengers from one to five. The contestant selected a limo and decided where to place all of that limo's passengers on one of the floors, one passenger per room, and received money for each occupied room ($1,000 on the first floor, $2,000 on the second, $3,000 on the third). Once there were at least three occupied rooms in each floor, the contestant could stop after any turn and keep the money. Filling every room awarded $100,000, but if the contestant was unable to place all the passengers from one limo without overloading a floor, the game ended and all money was lost.
 Park It: Ten colored cars were displayed, each worth a different amount from $1,000 to $10,000 in $1,000 increments, as well as a five-level parking garage. The contestant selected one car at a time and decided where to park it after seeing its value, with a requirement of one car per level, and its value was added to the bank, but a lower-valued car could not be placed above a higher-valued one. Once there was at least one car that could not be parked, the contestant could stop after any turn and keep the money. Filling the entire garage awarded $100,000, but if the contestant chose a car that could not be parked, the game ended and all money was lost. If no more cars could be placed into the garage, the game ended immediately and the contestant took the banked money.
Ride the Rails: Ten different railroad names were listed, including the four found on the classic Monopoly board (B&O, Pennsylvania, Reading, Short Line). Each railroad was represented by a model train pulling a different number of green cash cars ranging from one to ten, followed by a red caboose. The contestant had four chances to pick a railroad and watch its train emerge from a tunnel with the cash cars. There was also a button that had to be pressed at any time to stop the train before the caboose appeared. Once the train stopped, money for all revealed cash cars was banked, then the train pulled fully into view to reveal the remaining cash cars attached to it. If the caboose showed up and the button was not yet pressed, no money was banked for that train. Cash cars were worth $1,000 for the first train, $2,000 for the second, $3,000 for the third, and $5,000 for the fourth. The contestant won the full $100,000 for banking $50,000 or more, or the banked total otherwise.

$10,000 Games
Twice per episode in season 1, and once per episode in season 2, co-host Todd Newton invited a second-chance drawing winner to play a short game with a top prize of $10,000 and no risk of losing any money previously won. Three different games were played.

Cash Register: The contestant was given $1 to start the game, then chose two of the six keys on a cash register. In season 1, three keys each added one zero to the end of the total, while the other three added two zeroes each. In season 2, four keys each added one zero to the end of the total, while the other two added two zeroes each.
Money Bags: The contestant chose two money bags from a group of eight, with amounts of $50, $100, $500, and $1,000 hidden in two bags each. If the amounts in the chosen bags matched, the contestant won $10,000; otherwise, he/she won the sum of the two values. A ninth, empty bag was added for Season 2.
Hotels: The contestant chose two blueprints from a group of four. Each blueprint hid a different number of hotels from zero to three. If five hotels were found, the contestant won $10,000; otherwise, $250 was awarded for each hotel. A fifth blueprint, also hiding one hotel, was added for season 2.

Go for a Million
At the end of each show, one contestant would be able to play "Go for a Million", giving up all previous winnings (including the portion shared with the audience section the contestant represented) for a chance to win up to $1 million in cash and additional prizes. Two different methods were used to decide which contestant played. For the first half of season 1, the contestants who won prize money in their games secretly decided whether to take the risk. Their decisions were then revealed in ascending order of their totals, and the one willing to give up the most money played the game. In subsequent episodes, the contestants were ranked in descending order of their total winnings, and the host asked each in turn until one chose to play. If two or more contestants had the same total and no one ahead of them volunteered, each of them were required to decide whether to play.

Contestants who won nothing in their games became eligible if no one ahead of them chose to play. Ties between highest-scoring volunteers or non-winners were broken by random selection. Contestants in the short $10,000 games were not eligible to participate.

The contestant started at GO and attempted to make one full lap of the Monopoly board within five turns. Two dice were rolled on a shaker table referred to as the "Monopoly Rock-and-Roller". The contestant stopped it by pushing a button and moved clockwise according to the total shown. Rolling doubles awarded an extra roll. All colored properties awarded cash amounts, starting at $2,000 for Baltic Avenue (landing on Mediterranean Avenue was not possible, due to its being only one space away from GO) and increasing clockwise to $40,000 for Boardwalk. Other spaces awarded prizes or triggered mini-games as described below.

 Electric Company: Contestant's electric bills would be paid by the show's organizers for one year.
 Water Works: Contestant chose one of the four faucets, each awarding a different water-themed prize.
 Chance and Community Chest: Contestant chose one of the four cards, which could give bonuses or penalties as in the board game.
 Free Parking: Contestant chose one of the four parking meters, three with automotive-themed prizes and one with "Expired" (season 1; no prize) or "Lose a Roll" (season 2; contestant lost one turn).
 Railroads: Each awarded a trip (season 1) or offered the contestant a choice of three tunnels, two with trips and one with "Lose a Roll" (season 2).
 Just Visiting: Awarded a trip (season 1) or offered the contestant a choice of two jail cells, one with a prize and the other with "Lose a Roll" (season 2).
 Income Tax: Awarded cash or an extra roll.
 Luxury Tax: In season 1, the contestant chose one of the two ring boxes; one cut the cash prize in half, while the other forfeited all the money. In season 2, the contestant lost half the money and the game ended. Non-cash prizes were not affected in either season.
 Go to Jail: The game ended immediately and the contestant lost everything. 
 
Rolling three consecutive doubles, or drawing a "Go to Jail" card from Chance or Community Chest, had the same effect as landing on the "Go to Jail" space. During season 2, as soon as the contestant found the "Lose a Roll" penalty once, it was removed from play for all other spaces that included it as a possible choice.

Running out of turns without reaching GO or going to Jail, or landing on Luxury Tax in Season 2, split the final cash prize total with the audience section and allowed the contestant to keep all non-cash prizes. Passing GO augmented the cash total to $200,000, which was split with the section. Landing on GO exactly, either by dice roll or drawing an "Advance to GO" card from Chance or Community Chest, augmented the contestant's cash total to $1,000,000 and split the Audience Jackpot among the section. This jackpot was $200,000 for all but two episodes, in which it was $300,000. Winning the top prize also awarded the contestant a shiny, diamond-encrusted Mr. Monopoly top hat and a membership at the Monopoly Millionaires' Club. Four contestants had won this prize during the show's run.

External links

GSN website (via Internet Archive)

References

American game shows about lotteries
Television shows based on board games
2010s American game shows
2015 American television series debuts
2016 American television series endings
Monopoly (game)
Television series by Hasbro Studios
English-language television shows
Television shows based on Hasbro toys
First-run syndicated television programs in the United States
Television shows set in Las Vegas